Jamsola is a village in Bankura district, West Bengal, India. Its main industry is agricultural and has seen little to no industrial development. Its education, water and electrical systems have yet to be developed.

References

External links
http://wikimapia.org/7748277/Jamsola

Villages in Bankura district